Francis "Powerhouse" Blake (September 22, 1910 – date of death unknown) was an American baseball pitcher in the Negro leagues. He played with the Baltimore Black Sox in 1932, the New York Black Yankees in 1934, and the New York Cubans in 1935.

References

External links
 and Baseball-Reference Black Baseball stats and Seamheads 

Baltimore Black Sox players
New York Black Yankees players
New York Cubans players
1910 births
Year of death unknown
Baseball players from Boston
Baseball pitchers